58 Persei is a binary and possibly a triple star system in the northern constellation of Perseus. It has the Bayer designation e Persei, while 58 Persei is the Flamsteed designation. This system is visible to the naked eye as a faint point of light with an apparent visual magnitude of 4.26. It is approximately 800 light years away from the Sun based on parallax, and is drifting further away with a radial velocity of +10 km/s.

This is a single-lined spectroscopic binary system with an orbital period of 28.7 years and an eccentricity of 0.65. The primary member, designated component A, is an orange-hued (K–type) bright giant with a stellar classification of K1II. The star is around 50 million years old with 7 times the mass of the Sun. Having exhausted the supply of hydrogen at its core, it has expanded to roughly 56 times the Sun's radius. It is radiating 1,698 times the luminosity of the Sun from its enlarged photosphere at an effective temperature of 5,173 K.

The secondary, component B, appears to be a B-type main-sequence star with a stellar classification of B7V. It is a suspected binary of unknown period with component masses of 3.3 and 1.2 times the mass of the Sun.

References

K-type bright giants
B-type main-sequence stars
Spectroscopic binaries

Perseus (constellation)
BD+40 1000
Persei, e
Persei, 58
029094
021476
1454